Astragalus lobophorus is a species of milkvetch in the family Fabaceae.

References

lobophorus
Taxa named by Pierre Edmond Boissier